Gabriel Édouard Xavier Dupont (1 March 1878 – 1 August 1914) was a French composer, known for his operas and chamber music.

Biography
Dupont was born in Caen. Following after his father who was a teacher at the Malherbe secondary school and the organist at the Church Saint-Étienne in his home town, Dupont began his studies at the Paris Conservatory at the age of 15. There he studied composition with Jules Massenet, harmony with Antoine Taudou, and descant with André Gedalge. In 1895, he was also given instruction on the organ by Alexandre Guilmant. Between 1897 and 1903, he studied composition with Charles-Marie Widor.

In 1901, while performing his military service, Dupont competed for the Prix de Rome. He won second prize, behind André Caplet but ahead of Maurice Ravel. He was also named laureate of the Sonzogno competition for his opera La Cabrera, which was later presented with success at La Scala and then at the Théâtre national de l'Opéra-Comique in 1905.

In 1903, Dupont composed a cycle of fourteen pieces for the piano, Les Heures dolentes, during his convalescence from his first bout of tuberculosis – the disease that would ultimately cause his death at the age of 36. While residing at Cap Ferret, a small island refuge for tuberculosis patients, he composed another cycle of ten pieces for the piano, La Maison dans les dunes (1908–1909). Maurice Dumesnil premiered the suite on 3 June 1910 at the Salle Pleyel.

Dupont wrote three more operas: La Glu (1909), a Breton melodrama based on a novel by Jean Richepin; La Farce du cuvier (1911), using a libretto by Henri Caïn; and Antar (1912–14), also using a Caïn libretto. Antar was performed after Dupont's death in a grandiose and exotically dark production at the Opéra Comique in March 1921.

Dupont died from tuberculosis in Le Vésinet. The monument on his tomb is prominent in the cemetery there.

Dupont's brothers also had artistic careers. Maurice, curator of the Guimet Museum, was an Oriental expert and man of letters. Robert (1874–1949) was a landscaper for Sarthe and Brittany, as well as an official painter of the town halls of Paris.

Selected works
Operas
 La Cabrera, libretto by Henri Cain (1903)
 La Glu, libretto by Jean Richepin and Henri Cain (1908)
 La Farce du cuvier (1911)
 Antar, libretto by  Chekri Ganem (1913)

Vocal
 Trois Choeurs, songs from Normandy for women's choir (1900)
 Poèmes d'automne, songs (1904)

Orchestra
 Les Heures dolentes (1906)
 Le Chant de la Destinée, symphonic poem (1908)

Organ
 Allegretto (1898)
 Élévation en Si bémol majeur
 Pièce en forme de canon, published in L'Orgue moderne, 10th issue, edited by Charles-Marie Widor and Alexandre Guilmant (Paris: Leduc, 1897)
 Méditation, published in L'Orgue moderne, 15th isssue, edited by Charles-Marie Widor and Alexandre Guilmant (Paris: Leduc, 1899)
 Pour la Toussaint (1902)
 Offertoire, Élévation and Sortie, published in Archives de l'organiste, vol. 4, edited by H. Delépine (Arras: Procure Générale de musique religieuse, c. 1910)

Piano
 Deux Airs de Ballet (1895)
 Feuillets d'album (1897)
 Les Heures dolentes (1905)
 La Maison dans les Dunes (1909)

Chamber
 Journée de Printemps for violin and piano (1901)
 Poème for piano and string quartet (1911)

Recordings
Dupont's complete works for solo piano have been recorded by Émile Naoumoff, Marie-Catherine Girod, and Bo Ties.

A recording of La Cabrera has been released on the Bongiovanni label.

A recording of "Les Heures Dolentes", played by pianist Daniel Blumenthal, was released on the Cybella label.

Dupont's "Poème", "Journées de Printemps", as well as selections from "Heures dolentes" and "La Maison dans les dunes", were recorded by Marie-Catherine Girod and the Pražák Quartet and released on the Mirare label in 2014.  <https://www.amazon.com/Dupont-Heures-Dolentes-Marie-Catherine-Girod/dp/B00ITYHBLA/ref=sr_1_2?dchild=1&keywords=PRA%C5%BD%C3%81K+Quartet&qid=1635134766&rnid=2941120011&s=music&sr=1-2>

Bibliography
 Robert Jardillier, Hommage à Gabriel Dupont, in Revue de Bourgogne, vol. 12, p. 635–646 (Dijon, 1924)
 Philippe Simon, Gabriel Dupont (1878–1914), ou La Mélancolie du Bonheur, Atlantica-Séguier (2001).
 Adriano Spampanato, Gabriel Dupont, un compositeur méconnu, CNSMDP, Master's thesis, 2016
 Adriano Spampanato, En attendant Dupont ..., in: Revue Massenet, no. 14, p. 50–58, Mortagne-au-Perche 2018
 Bo Ties, An Orchestral Approach to the Piano Works of Gabriel Dupont. Remembering and Recording a Forgotten Musician, DMA (Doctor of Musical Arts) thesis (University of Iowa, 2018)

References

External links
 
 Dupont: Complete Works for Solo Piano, by Émile Naoumoff
, 4 excerpts by Daniel Blumenthal, piano
, complete, Stéphane Lemelin, piano
, Sara Chen and Pablo Muńoz, violin; Jae Choi, cello; Émile Naoumoff, piano

1878 births
1914 deaths
19th-century classical composers
19th-century French composers
19th-century French male musicians
20th-century classical composers
20th-century deaths from tuberculosis
20th-century French composers
20th-century French male musicians
Conservatoire de Paris alumni
French male classical composers
French Romantic composers
Musicians from Caen
Prix de Rome for composition
Tuberculosis deaths in France